This article gives an overview of liberal parties in Bolivia. It is limited to liberal parties with substantial support, mainly proved by having had a representation in parliament. The sign ⇒ means a reference to another party in that scheme. For inclusion in this scheme it isn't necessary so that parties labeled themselves as a liberal party.

Introduction
Liberalism was organized as a part of the oligarchy as the opposition to conservatism. It didn't survive the 1952 revolution.

The timeline

Liberal Party
1883: Liberals formed the Liberal Party (Partido Liberal)
1913: A dissident faction of the Liberal Party formed Radical Party (Partido Radical)
1943: After the revolution of 1943 the Partido Radical disappeared.
1952: After the revolution of 1952 the Partido Liberal de facto disappeared as a political party

Liberal leader
Hernán Siles Zuazo

See also
 History of Bolivia
 Politics of Bolivia
 List of political parties in Bolivia

References

Bolivia
Political movements in Bolivia